March 6 - Eastern Orthodox liturgical calendar - March 8

All fixed commemorations below are observed on March 20 by Orthodox Churches on the Old Calendar.

For March 7th, Orthodox Churches on the Old Calendar commemorate the Saints listed on February 22 (February 23 on leap years).

Saints

 Martyrs Codratus (Quadratus), Saturninus, and Rufinus, of Nicomedia (250-259)  (see also: May 7)
 Martyrs Aemilian the Roman, and Jacob (James) and Marianos with him, under Valerian (259)
 The Holy Hieromartyrs of Cherson: 
 Basil, Ephraim, Capito, Eugene, Aetherius, Elpidius, and Agathadorus (4th century)
 Venerable Paul the Simple, of Egypt (ca. 339), disciple of St. Anthony the Great.
 Saints Nestor and Arcadius, Bishops of Tremithous, in Cyprus (4th century) 
 Venerable Ephraim of Antioch, Patriarch of Antioch (546) 
 Saint Paul the Confessor, Bishop of Plousias in Bithynia (ca. 840)

Pre-Schism Western saints

 Martyrs Perpetua of Carthage, and the catechumens Felicity, Saturus (Satyrus), Saturninus, Revocatus and Secundulus at Carthage (202-203)  (see also: February 1 - East.)
 Saint Gaudiosus of Brescia, Confessor and Bishop of Brescia in Italy, where his relics were venerated (445)
 Saint Enodoch (Wenedoc), a saint in Wales  (ca. 520) 
 Saint Drausinus (Drausius), Bishop of Soissons, did much to encourage monasticism (ca. 576) 
 Saint Deifer, founder of Bodfari in Clwyd in Wales (6th century) 
 Saint Emilian, monk, of Italia (6th century)
 Saint Eosterwine, the second Anglo-Saxon Abbot of Wearmouth in Northumbria (688)
 Saint John of Beverley, Bishop of York (721)  (see also: May 7)
 Saint Ardo Smaragdus, a hagiographer, abbot of the monastery of Aniane (843)

Post-Schism Orthodox saints

 Venerable Laurence (Lavrentios of Megara), founder of the monastery of the Mother of God Phaneromeni on Salamis Island (1707)
 Saint Dandus (Dandas) and All Saints of Thrace.

New martyrs and confessors

 New Hieromartyr Nicholas, Priest (1930)
 New Hieromartyr Nilus (Tyutyukin), Hieromonk of St. Joseph of Volokolamsk Monastery (1938)
 Virgin-martyrs Matrona, Mary, Eudocia, Ecaterina, Antonina, Nadezhda, Xenia, and Anna (1938)

Other commemorations

 Synaxis of the Saints of the Dodecanese.  
 Repose of Schemamonk Sisoes of Valaam (1931)

Icons

 Icon of the Most Holy Theotokos "Surety of Sinners"  in Korets (1622), Odrin (1843) and Moscow (1848).  (see also May 29)
 Icon of the Most Holy Theotokos "Of Czestochowa".  (see also" March 6)

Icon gallery

Notes

References

Sources
 March 7/March 20. Orthodox Calendar (PRAVOSLAVIE.RU).
 March 20 / March 7. HOLY TRINITY RUSSIAN ORTHODOX CHURCH (A parish of the Patriarchate of Moscow).
 March 7. OCA - The Lives of the Saints.
 The Autonomous Orthodox Metropolia of Western Europe and the Americas (ROCOR). St. Hilarion Calendar of Saints for the year of our Lord 2004. St. Hilarion Press (Austin, TX). p. 20.
 March 7. Latin Saints of the Orthodox Patriarchate of Rome.
 The Roman Martyrology. Transl. by the Archbishop of Baltimore. Last Edition, According to the Copy Printed at Rome in 1914. Revised Edition, with the Imprimatur of His Eminence Cardinal Gibbons. Baltimore: John Murphy Company, 1916. pp. 68–69.
Greek Sources
 Great Synaxaristes:  7 ΜΑΡΤΙΟΥ. ΜΕΓΑΣ ΣΥΝΑΞΑΡΙΣΤΗΣ.
  Συναξαριστής. 7 Μαρτίου. ECCLESIA.GR. (H ΕΚΚΛΗΣΙΑ ΤΗΣ ΕΛΛΑΔΟΣ).
Russian Sources
  20 марта (7 марта). Православная Энциклопедия под редакцией Патриарха Московского и всея Руси Кирилла (электронная версия). (Orthodox Encyclopedia - Pravenc.ru).
  7 марта (ст.ст.) 20 марта 2013 (нов. ст.). Русская Православная Церковь Отдел внешних церковных связей. (DECR).

March in the Eastern Orthodox calendar